Veigaiidae is a family of mites belonging to the superorder Parasitiformes. However they are not parasitic but free-living and predatory and are found in soil and decaying organic matter. Some species are specialists of rocky shorelines. Members of this family can be distinguished by a hyaline appendage on the tarsus of the pedipalp.

Genera
 Cyrthydrolaelaps Berlese, 1904
 Gamasolaelaps Berlese, 1903
 Gorirossia Farrier, 1957
 Veigaia Oudemans, 1905

References
Evans, G. Owen (1959): The genera Cyrthydrolaelaps Berlese and Gamasolaelaps Berlese (Acarina: Mesostigmata). Acarologia I.
Joel Hallan's Biology Catalog: Veigaiidae

Mesostigmata
Taxa named by Anthonie Cornelis Oudemans
Acari families